"Break the World" is the lead single by alternative rock band Nine Lashes from their third album, From Water to War. It was released on October 29, 2013 by Tooth & Nail Records. The song was the No. 1 Billboard Christian Rock song on January 25, 2014 chart.

Release 
"Break the World" was digitally released as the lead single from From Water to War on October 29, 2013 by Tooth & Nail Records.

Weekly charts

References 

2013 singles
Nine Lashes songs
2013 songs
Tooth & Nail Records singles
Songs written by Trevor McNevan